"Maybe Someday" is a 2004 song by The Ordinary Boys.

Maybe Someday may also refer to:

 "Maybe Someday", a song by Simply Red from their 1987 album Men and Women
 "Maybe Someday", a promo-only single from The Cure from their 2000 album Bloodflowers
 "Maybe Someday", a song by The Incredible String Band from their 1966 album The Incredible String Band
 "Maybe Someday", a song by Bob Dylan from his 1986 album Knocked Out Loaded
 "Maybe Someday", a song by Loverboy from their 1997 album Six
 "Maybe Someday", a song by Black Stone Cherry from their 2006 album Black Stone Cherry
 "Maybe Someday", a song by the Cinematics from their 2007 album A Strange Education

See also
Someday Maybe, a 1996 album by The Clarks